The 2017 Latin American Series was the fifth edition of the Latin American Series, a baseball sporting event played by the champions of the professional winter leagues that make up the Latin American Professional Baseball Association (ALBP) and the last series containing representatives exclusively from the ALBP's founding nations. 

The competition took place at Estadio Dieciocho de Junio in Montería, Colombia from January 26 to January 29, 2017.

Participating teams

Group Phase 

NOTE: Because first, second and third place were tied, Leones de Montería qualified for the final as the representative of the host nation. Tigres de Chinandega qualified via a random draw. 

|}

Final 

Boxscore

Statistics leaders

References

External links 
 Official Site

Latin American Series
2017 in baseball
International baseball competitions hosted by Colombia
Latin American Series
Montería